Mohi Din Hamaky (17 January 1929 – 9 September 2017) was an Egyptian boxer. He competed in the men's lightweight event at the 1952 Summer Olympics.

References

1929 births
2017 deaths
Egyptian male boxers
Olympic boxers of Egypt
Boxers at the 1952 Summer Olympics
Lightweight boxers
20th-century Egyptian people